Faith Holsaert (born 1943) is an American educator and activist during the Civil Rights Movement.

Holsaert was born in New York City in 1943. She was raised by her Jewish mother, Eunice Spellman Holsaert, who was divorced, and her female African American music teacher, Charity Abigail Bailey, in the same household, in Greenwich Village. Being brought up in a biracial household, headed by two mother-figures, she was raised in the midst much unrest and disapproval from those around her. She volunteered for the Harlem Brotherhood Group and the Student Nonviolent Coordinating Committee as a teenager. She matriculated to Barnard University in 1961, when she first participated in a sit-in in Crisfield, Maryland to protest racial segregation. She was arrested at the sit-in. She registered voters in Terrell County, Georgia in 1962. She also volunteered for the Brown Berets. She resides in Durham, North Carolina.

As a white, woman activist of organizations and movements such as SNCC (student nonviolent coordinating committee), women's rights, LGBT community, Faith has come across several hardships throughout the course of her life and is still seen to be very active in the community. She has a collection of letters and papers written, documenting her experiences and actions as an activist, called the "Faith Holsaert Papers".

References

External links
 SNCC Digital Gateway: Faith Holsaert, Documentary website created by the SNCC Legacy Project and Duke University, telling the story of the Student Nonviolent Coordinating Committee & grassroots organizing from the inside-out

Living people
1943 births
Activists from New York City
People from Durham, North Carolina
Activists for African-American civil rights
Jewish women
Student Nonviolent Coordinating Committee
Jewish American activists
Jewish anti-racism activists
21st-century American Jews